Skinnand is a deserted medieval village in Lincolnshire, England. During the English Civil War of 1642-1646 the church fell into ruins. Today only fields and one deserted farmhouse remain.

History

Early history 
Archaeological investigations in the area around Skinnand indicate the countryside was occupied from at least the Bronze Age, in about 600 BC. Skinnand was recorded as "Schinende" in the Domesday Book of 1086, a name thought to be of Anglo-Saxon origin. Historians believe the original name may have come from the Old Scandinavian word "skinnari," which means "skinner or tanner."

Middle Ages 
The ancient parish of Skinnand was recorded as the smallest village in the Deanery of Longoboby in 1332. It had the lowest tax assessment, a population of around 40 and was predominantly based on agriculture. The population of Skinnand stayed stable for many generations but, by 1563, only three of the original ten households remained. This decrease in numbers has been attributed, by some historians, to a reduction in arable farming and a rise in sheep production.

Records show that the village of Skinnand had up to six houses before the English Civil War, most built as small single-storey stone dwellings with thatched roofs. Two, however, were much larger. One was owned by a John Chester, which boasted four domestic rooms with 'upper chambers,' and the other was the parsonage. The parsonage included a hall, two parlours, a kitchen, buttery, milkhouse, brewhouse and stable. It also had three upstairs rooms, as well as an orchard, garden, yard and dovecote. It is believed the parsonage was pulled down, however, during the Civil War and, by the time of the Hearth Tax returns of 1665, there were just three houses in Skinnand.

Details about the Norman-built Anglican church of Skinnand are sketchy, although it was reputedly dedicated to St Matthew and burned down by Oliver Cromwell's forces in the 1640s. Historical records certainly show that it had begun to fall into ruins in the 17th century - at around the time of the English Civil War. The Glebe Terrier documents of 1700 recorded: "The church was in ruins, no house for the rector, more than this we find not, all the buildings being long since disappeared." Despite the disappearance of the church, parish registers reveal that services were still held throughout the 19th century, at the home of Skinnand man John Woolfitt. The Skinnand burial ground was also in use until 1911.

19th century 
Skinnand was a village of just 12 people in 1801, according to the Census returns. The population did rise slightly over the next 100 years, to 30 in 1901, but by 1921 numbers were once again decreasing and the figure stood at 25. Census returns also reveal that most of the village men worked on the land as unskilled labourers. The children of these poor labourers attended school at Wellingore, just south of Navenby, and at Carlton-le-Moorland and Bassingham - each village several miles walk away.

As a result of the 1834 Poor Law Amendment Act, the parish became part of the Lincoln Poor Law Union and, by the mid-19th century, Skinnand was a struggling parish in the Higher division of the wapentake of Boothby Graffoe. The records add: "The living is a discharged rectory, valued in the King's books at £5. 13. 11½.; net income, £85; patron, S. Nicholls, Esq. The church is in ruins." Skinnand was also the main residence in the area for the Woolfitt family, land owners and clergy at the church. Headstones for members of the Woolfitt family, including local Methodist minister John Woolfitt, can be found in the remains of the cemetery.

In 1871 it was recorded that "just a few stones remain to mark the location" of the old church. In the same year, the Census showed that the parish now consisted of only three farms, all belonging to Mr S. Nicholls of London. Other surnames in the parish at that time included Clawson, Burt and Picker.

20th century 
The 1911 Census shows that the population of Skinnand was once again in decline at the turn of the 20th century, with just 28 people living in the village. Most were tenant labourers as, by 1913, William Grant of Grimsby was the principal landowner. The village was occupied for just a few more years, however, before the final families moved out. Today, just a boarded up old farm house stands where the thriving community of Skinnand once was.

Governance 
The parish of Skinnand was in the higher division of the ancient Boothby Graffoe wapentake, in the North Kesteven division of the county of Lincolnshire. The term wapentake dates back to the Vikings and was used to describe a collection of local parishes. It meant "show your weapon" and the idea behind the term was that all those in favour of a resolution would raise their sword or axe to show agreement.

The History of the County of Lincoln, a book written by Thomas Allen in 1834, states:

Skinnand was classed as an ancient parish from the 11th to the 19th century, as it came "under the jurisdiction of a clergyman" and existed before 1597. Early records show that the Manor of Navenby and Skinnand was granted to the Dean and Chapter of Lincoln in 1292. The money generated by land rent was used by Roger de Newton, the first incumbent of the chantry chapel at Harby, Nottinghamshire, to maintain the building. This followed the death of Queen Eleanor, wife of Edward I, while on a visit to Lincoln. Eleanor died at de Newton's manor house at Harby in November 1290 and the chapel was erected in her honour.

The parish began to take on civil and ecclesiastical duties following the 16th century Dissolution of the Monasteries and the Tudor Poor Law Acts of 1601. The ecclesiastical parish of Navenby was placed in the Longoboby Rural Deanery, but was transferred to the Graffoe Rural Deanery in 1968, and it is still part of the Diocese of Lincoln. Navenby became a civil parish in the 19th century and became a member of the Lincoln Poor Law Union in 1834. The parish was also part of the Lincoln Rural Sanitary District. The Skinnand civil parish boundaries were adjusted in 1931, to include the civil parish of nearby Navenby.

Following the Local Government Act 1888, Skinnand was governed by Branston Rural District Council from 1894 to 1931. The village then came under the control of North Kesteven Rural District Council from 1931 to 1974, after the Local Government Act 1972 reformed the districts of Holland, Kesteven and much of Lindsey into the shire county of Lincolnshire. Today Skinnand remains part of the North Kesteven district.

Before the 1832 Reform Act, Lincolnshire sent twelve members to parliament, including two for the county, two for the city of Lincoln and two for the boroughs of Boston, Grantham, Great Grimsby and Stamford. As a result of the act, Lincolnshire's electoral divisions were amended, and Skinnand became part of the South Division Parliamentary District for Lincolnshire. Two Whig candidates, Henry Handley and Gilbert John Heathcote, were returned in the first election. The village remained in the South Division until 1867, when it was transferred to the Mid Division. In 1885 it joined the North Kesteven Division, and in 1918 it became part of the Grantham Division, until 1974.

Geography
The civil parish of Skinnand lies close to the old Roman Ermine Street, known locally as High Dyke. The Viking Way, a 147-mile (237 km) footpath between the Humber Bridge in North Lincolnshire and Oakham in Rutland, also passes through the parish.

The small cliff is one of only a few hills in Lincolnshire. Lying 8.7 miles (14 km) south of Lincoln and 8.9 miles (14.3 km) north-northwest of Sleaford, Skinnand enjoys warm summers and dry frosty winters.

During the Ice Age, most of the region surrounding Skinnand was covered by ice sheets and this has influenced the topography and nature of the soils. Much of Lincolnshire is low-lying, in some places below sea level, including Skinnand. The parish of Skinnand and Navenby is elongated in an east–west direction, extending east to the Lincoln Heath and west to the River Brant. The size of the parish has varied over the past two centuries.

Climate
According to the Köppen classification, the British Isles experience a maritime climate characterised by relatively cool summers and mild winters. Compared with other parts of the country, Lincolnshire – and Skinnand – are slightly warmer and sunnier in the summer and colder and frostier in the winter. Owing to Skinnand's inland position, far from the landfall of most Atlantic depressions, it is one of the driest places to live in the UK, receiving, on average, less than 3 ft (600 mm) of rain per year. The mean annual daily duration of bright sunshine is four hours and 12 minutes; the absence of any high ground is probably responsible for the area being one of the sunniest parts of the British Isles.

References

External links

 David Merchant (2011). Historical notes and images concerning the medieval village of Skinnand as recorded on the website www.skinnand.co.uk/

Deserted medieval villages in Lincolnshire
Archaeological sites in Lincolnshire